Axel Camblan (born 18 June 2003) is a French professional footballer who plays as a forward for  club Concarneau on loan from Brest.

Club career
Camblan is a youth product of Légion Saint Pierre, Cavale Blanche, EA Saint-Renan and Brest's youth academy. On 21 September 2022, he signed his first professional contract with the club. after a strong 2021-22 season with their reserves. He made his professional and Ligue 1 debut as a late substitute with Brest in a 2–1 loss to Lorient on 8 October 2022.

On 31 January 2023, Camblan joined Concarneau in the Championnat National on loan until the end of the 2022–23 season.

Personal life
Camblan's grandfather Alain, and grand-uncle Daniel Camblan were both professional footballers in France.

References

External links
 
 

2003 births
Living people
Sportspeople from Brest, France
French footballers
Association football forwards
Stade Brestois 29 players
US Concarneau players
Ligue 1 players
Championnat National 3 players